Terzan 5 is a heavily obscured globular cluster belonging to the bulge (the central star concentration) of the Milky Way galaxy. It was one of six globulars discovered by French astronomer Agop Terzan in 1968 and was initially labeled Terzan 11. The cluster was cataloged by the Two-Micron Sky Survey as IRC–20385. It is situated in the Sagittarius constellation in the direction of the Milky Way's center. Terzan 5 probably follows an unknown complicated orbit around the center of the galaxy, but currently it is moving towards the Sun with a speed of around 90 km/s.

Physical properties
The absolute magnitude of Terzan 5 is at least . Its bolometric luminosity is about 800,000 times that of the Sun, while its mass is about 2 million solar masses. The small core of Terzan 5—about 0.5 pc in size—has one of the highest star densities in the galaxy. The cluster also has one of the highest metallicities among the Milky Way's globular clusters—[Fe/H]=−0.21.

In 2009 it was discovered that Terzan 5 consists of at least two generations of stars with ages of 12 and 4.5 billion years and slightly different metallicities, possibly indicating that it is the core of a disrupted dwarf galaxy, not a true globular cluster. There are only a few other globular clusters in the Milky Way that contain stars with different ages. Among them are M54 and Omega Centauri. The cluster also contains around 1300 core helium burning horizontal branch (HB) stars, including at least one RR Lyrae variable star.

Pulsars and X-ray sources
Terzan 5 is known to contain at least 34 millisecond radio pulsars; their true number may be as high as 200. The first such object, PSR B1744-24A, discovered in 1990, has the period of 11.56 ms. The population of pulsars inside Terzan 5 includes PSR J1748–2446ad, the fastest known millisecond pulsar, which is spinning at 716 Hz (the rotation period is 1.40 ms).

Terzan 5 also contains an X-ray burster, discovered in 1980, known as Terzan 5 or XB 1745-25. It also contains around 50 weaker X-ray sources, many of which are likely Low-mass X-ray binaries (LMXB) or cataclysmic variables.

The large number of X-ray sources and millisecond pulsars may be a direct consequence of the high density of the cluster's core, which leads to a high rate of star collisions, and to formation of close binaries, including binary systems which contain a neutron star.

In addition to discrete X-ray sources Terzan 5 produces a diffuse non-thermal X-ray emission and high (a few GeV) and ultra-high (0.5–24 TeV) energy gamma-rays. The high energy gamma rays probably originate in the magnetosphere of abundant millisecond pulsars, while ultra-high energy gamma rays likely result from the inverse Compton scattering by the relativistic electron emitted by the pulsars off the cosmic microwave background radiation.

Gallery

Notes

References

Terzan 05
Sagittarius (constellation)